The 2022 NSW Open was a professional tennis tournament played on outdoor hard courts. It was the second edition of the tournament which was part of the 2022 ATP Challenger Tour and the eighth edition of the tournament which was part of the 2022 ITF Women's World Tennis Tour. It took place in Sydney, Australia between 31 October and 6 November 2022.

Champions

Men's singles

  Hsu Yu-hsiou def.  Marc Polmans 6–4, 7–6(7–5).

Women's singles

  Mai Hontama def.  Petra Hule, 7–6(7–1), 3–6, 7–5.

Men's doubles

  Blake Ellis /  Tristan Schoolkate def.  Ajeet Rai /  Yuta Shimizu 4–6, 7–5, [11–9].

Women's doubles

  Destanee Aiava /  Lisa Mays def.  Alexandra Osborne /  Jessy Rompies, 5–7, 6–3, [10–6].

Men's singles main draw entrants

Seeds

 1 Rankings are as of 24 October 2022.

Other entrants
The following players received wildcards into the singles main draw:
  Jeremy Beale
  Alex Bolt
  Blake Ellis

The following player received entry into the singles main draw as an alternate:
  Colin Sinclair

The following players received entry from the qualifying draw:
  Mitchell Harper
  Yuichiro Inui
  Jeremy Jin
  Luke Saville
  Yusuke Takahashi
  Mark Whitehouse

The following player received entry as a lucky loser:
  Ajeet Rai

Women's singles main draw entrants

Seeds

 1 Rankings are as of 24 October 2022.

Other entrants
The following players received wildcards into the singles main draw:
  Petra Hule
  Tina Nadine Smith

The following players received entry from the qualifying draw:
  Makenna Jones
  Lisa Mays
  Kaylah McPhee
  Junri Namigata
  Michika Ozeki
  Sarah-Rebecca Sekulic
  Marianna Zakarlyuk
  Zuzana Zlochová

The following player received entry as a lucky loser:
  Sara Nayar

References

External links
 2022 NSW Open at ITFtennis.com
 Official website

2022 ATP Challenger Tour
2022 ITF Women's World Tennis Tour
2022 in Australian tennis
October 2022 sports events in Australia
November 2022 sports events in Australia